Konstantin Aleksandrovich Glazachev (born February 18, 1985) is a Russian former ice hockey forward. He most recently played for Admiral Vladivostok in the Kontinental Hockey League (KHL).

Playing career
Glazachev moved to Yaroslavl at a young age and is a product of the HC Lokomotiv hockey system. The young player was also consistently a member of Russia's both U18 and U20 national squads. The young player was drafted by the Nashville Predators early in the second round with the 35th overall selection of the 2003 NHL Entry Draft. Since the draft he has consistently skated in the former Russian Super League and the current Kontinental Hockey League, but has struggled to build on the success he enjoyed earlier in his career.

Career statistics

Regular season and playoffs

International

References

External links 

RussianProspects.com Konstantin Glazachev Player Profile

1985 births
Admiral Vladivostok players
Ak Bars Kazan players
Amur Khabarovsk players
Barys Nur-Sultan players
HC Dinamo Minsk players
HC Dynamo Moscow players
HC Sibir Novosibirsk players
HC Spartak Moscow players
HC Yugra players
Living people
Lokomotiv Yaroslavl players
Metallurg Magnitogorsk players
Metallurg Novokuznetsk players
Nashville Predators draft picks
Sportspeople from Arkhangelsk
Russian ice hockey left wingers
SKA Saint Petersburg players